The B57 nuclear bomb was a tactical nuclear weapon developed by the United States during the Cold War.

Entering production in 1963 as the Mk 57, the bomb was designed to be dropped from high-speed tactical aircraft. It had a streamlined casing to withstand supersonic flight. It was 3 m (9 ft 10 in) long, with a diameter of about 37.5 cm (14.75 in). Basic weight was approximately 227 kilograms (500 lbs).

Some versions of the B57 were equipped with a parachute retarder (a 3.8 m/12.5 ft diameter nylon/kevlar ribbon parachute) to slow the weapon's descent, allowing the aircraft to escape the blast (or to allow the weapon to survive impact with the ground in laydown mode) at altitudes as low as 15 m (50 ft). Various fuzing modes were available, including a hydrostatic fuze for use as a depth charge for anti-submarine use.

The B57 was produced in six versions (mods) with explosive yields ranging from 5 to 20 kilotons. Mod 0 was 5 kt, Mod 1 and Mod 2 were 10 kt, Mod 3 and Mod 4 were 15 kt, and Mod 5 was 20 kt. The depth bomb version of the B57, for the U.S. Navy, replaced the Mk 101 Lulu and had selectable yield up to 10 kt.

The B57 used the Tsetse primary design for its core design, shared with several other mid- and late-1950s designs.

The B57 was produced from 1963 to 1967. After 1968, the weapon became known as the B57 rather than the Mk 57. 3,100 weapons were built, the last of which was retired in June 1993.

The B57 could be deployed by most U.S. fighter, bomber and Navy antisubmarine warfare and patrol aircraft (S-3 Viking and P-3 Orion), and by some U.S. Navy helicopters including the SH-3 Sea King.  The B57 was also deployed with Canada's CF-104s in Germany, and the Royal Air Force's Nimrod from RAF St Mawgan and RAF Kinloss in the United Kingdom and Malta in the Mediterranean.

See also
 Tsetse primary
 List of nuclear weapons

References

External links
 Allbombs.html list of all US nuclear weapons at nuclearweaponarchive.org
 Beware the old story by Chuck Hansen, Bulletin of the Atomic Scientists, March/April 2001 pp. 52–55 (vol. 57, no. 02)
 A guide to British nuclear weapons by Brian Burnell
Video showing shipboard handling procedures for the B57 bomb

Cold War aerial bombs of the United States
Cold War anti-submarine weapons of the United States
Tactical nuclear weapons
Nuclear bombs of the United States
Depth charges
Nuclear weapons of Canada
Military equipment introduced in the 1960s